The following is a list of Teen Choice Award winners and nominees for Choice Music - Break-Up Song. It was first given out in 2007 as Choice Music - Payback Track but was retitled in 2011. Taylor Swift is the only artist to win this award twice.

Winners and nominees

2007

2010s

References

Pop music awards
Break-Up Song